Washington Street station is an at-grade station on the Blue Line and Green Line of the San Diego Trolley system. It is located along the Surf Line right of way at West Washington Street, in a largely industrial area of San Diego. The stop also serves the Marine Corps Recruit Depot San Diego and the Mission Hills neighborhood, which includes a variety of medium-density housing within blocks of the station.

This station opened on June 16, 1996 as part of the North/South Line (later renamed the Blue Line) extension to the Old Town Transit Center. On July 2, 2011, the station was closed to undergo renovations as part of the Trolley Renewal Project. It was originally supposed to be reopened by early September, but numerous construction issues pushed the reopening back to November 24, 2011.

Station layout
There are four tracks, two for the trolley station and two passing tracks for commuter, intercity, and BNSF freight service.

See also
 List of San Diego Trolley stations

References

Blue Line (San Diego Trolley)
Green Line (San Diego Trolley)
Railway stations in the United States opened in 1996
San Diego Trolley stations in San Diego
1996 establishments in California
Airport railway stations in the United States
San Diego International Airport